|}

The King Richard III Stakes is a Listed flat horse race in Great Britain open to horses aged four years or older. It is run over a distance of 7 furlongs at Leicester in April.

History
During the late 1970s and early 1980s, the event was known as the Philip Cornes Trophy Stakes. It was renamed the Leicestershire Stakes in 1983.

Holsten Brewery started to sponsor the race in 1984, and from this point it was called the Holsten Pils Trophy. It reverted to its previous title in 1988.

For a period the Leicestershire Stakes held Listed status. It was promoted to Group 3 level in 1999, and relegated back to Listed class in 2004.

The race was given its present title in 2013. It is now named after King Richard III, whose skeleton was discovered in Leicester and identified earlier that year.

Records
Most successful horse since 1978 (3 wins):
 Warningford – 1999, 2001, 2002

Leading jockey since 1978 (3 wins):
 Ray Cochrane – Rami (1991), Warningford (1999), Sugarfoot (2000)
 Richard Hughes - Tillerman (2003), Producer (2013), Coulsty (2015)

Leading trainer since 1978 (3 wins):
 Henry Cecil – Belmont Bay (1981), Valiyar (1983), Monsagem (1990)
 Richard Hannon Sr. – Shalford (1992), Swing Low (1993), Producer (2013)
 James Fanshawe – Warningford (1999, 2001, 2002)

Winners since 1978

See also
 Horse racing in Great Britain
 List of British flat horse races

References

 Racing Post:
 , 

 pedigreequery.com – Leicestershire Stakes – Leicester.

Open mile category horse races
Leicester Racecourse
Flat races in Great Britain